Daryl Beattie (born 26 September 1970 in Charleville, Queensland, Australia) is a former Grand Prix solo motorcycle road racer.

Motorsport career
Beattie posted several good results at the beginning of the 1992 500cc Grand Prix season then teamed up with Wayne Gardner to win the prestigious Suzuka 8 Hours endurance race in Japan. His performance earned him a place on the Honda factory team alongside fellow Australian Mick Doohan for the 1993 season. He won his first Grand Prix that year at the German Grand Prix at Hockenheimring and finished the season in a promising third place behind Kevin Schwantz and Wayne Rainey. After the season, he was inexplicably released by the Honda team.

Beattie had a lackluster season in 1994 on a Team Roberts Marlboro Yamaha. During the 1994 season at the French Le Mans circuit, he crashed and lost all the toes from one foot after his foot was caught between the chain and rear sprocket. He had his best year in 1995 with the Suzuki factory team, leading the championship for the first part of the season before his crash at Assen allowed Doohan to win the championship with Beattie finishing in second, 33 points behind Doohan.

Beattie's career took a blow in 1996 when he crashed in pre-season testing and suffered serious head injuries. He returned only to suffer another crash at the fourth race of the season in Spain. He then crashed again at the sixth round in France. He struggled through the 1997 season but never regained his previous form and announced his retirement from competitive racing at the end of the season.

In 2002 he took up V8 Supercar racing in Imrie Motor Sport's Holden VX Commodore VX at the Queensland 500 and Bathurst 1000. He placed 25th at Queensland Raceway and did not finish at Bathurst.

Television
In retirement Beattie took up a role as a specialist commentator with Network Ten on broadcasts of motorcycle racing, initially calling the 125 cc & 250 cc races and then taking over from Barry Sheene to call the MotoGP races after Sheene died from cancer. He was subsequently added to the presenters on RPM. Beattie now works as a commentator on Network Ten's partially sports themed channel 10 Bold. As of 2015 he is the co-host of Ten's Formula One coverage alongside Matthew White and expert F1 commentator,  World Champion Alan Jones.

In 2015 in an interview on The Project he commented on the 1994 Le Mans motorcycle accident where he lost the toes of his left foot in the motorcycle chain.

Grand Prix career statistics

Points system from 1988 to 1992

Points system from 1993

(key) (Races in bold indicate pole position; races in italics indicate fastest lap)

Complete V8 Supercar results

References

1970 births
Living people
People from South West Queensland
Australian amputees
Australian motorcycle racers
Australian racing drivers
250cc World Championship riders
500cc World Championship riders
Supercars Championship drivers
Motorsport announcers
Superbike World Championship riders